Christine Ross may refer to:
 Christine Ross (art historian)
 Christine Ross (rugby union)
 Christine Ross Barker, née Ross, Canadian pacifist and suffragist